TLN may refer to:

 Toulon-Hyères Airport, France, IATA code
 Telelatino, Spanish and Italian cable channel in Canada
 Total Living Network, a US religious television network
 Thermolysin, an enzyme